Slow keys is a feature of computer desktop environments. It is an accessibility feature to aid users who have physical disabilities. Slow keys allows the user to specify the duration for which one must press-and-hold a key before the system accepts the keypress.

External links
How to configure Slow Keys in Microsoft Windows 10

Computer accessibility
User interface techniques